Rhodomicrobium udaipurense is a Gram-negative, facultatively anaerobic, phototrophic, psychrotolerant bacterium from the genus of Rhodomicrobium which was isolated from a freshwater stream.

References

Further reading

External links
Type strain of Rhodomicrobium udaipurense at BacDive -  the Bacterial Diversity Metadatabase

Hyphomicrobiales
Bacteria described in 2013